Muhammad Haykal is the name of:
 Muhammad Husayn Haykal (1888–1956), Egyptian writer
 Mohamed Hassanein Heikal (1923–2016), Egyptian writer, journalist and politician
 Muhammed Hussein Heikal, Egyptian writer, journalist, politician and Minister of Education in Egypt